Gaeana is a genus of cicadas, most members of which have colourful marking on their forewings, found across tropical and temperate Asia. Their bright wing patterns have been hypothesized as being a case of Batesian mimicry where the toxic models may be day-flying moths of the subfamilies Zygaeninae and Arctiinae. It is closely related to the genus Tosena but is differentiated by the exposed tympanum and lacks spines on the sides of the pronotum.

Species
BioLib and the Global Biodiversity Information Facility list:
 Gaeana atkinsoni Distant, 1892
 Gaeana cheni Chou, Lei, Li, Lu & Yao, 1997
 Gaeana chinensis Kato, 1940
 Gaeana consors Atkinson, 1884
 Gaeana hainanensis Chou & Yao, 1895
 Gaeana maculata (Drury, 1773) 
 Gaeana nigra Lei & Chou, 1997
 Gaeana variegata Yen, Robinson & Quicke, 2005

Note: species previously placed here are now included in: Ambragaeana, Balinta, Becquartina, Callogaeana (including C. festiva), Sulphogaeana and Tosena

References

Hemiptera of Asia
Gaeanini
Cicadidae genera